Railway hotel may refer to:
 A railway hotel, a hotel built near a railway station
 Railway Hotel, Edgware, a former pub and hotel in Edgware, London
 Railway Hotel, Gympie, a hotel in Gympie, Australia
 Railway Hotel, Parkerville, Australia, a heritage pub now trading as the Parkerville Tavern
 Railway Hotel, Perth, a former hotel in Perth, Australia
Railway Hotel, Port Adelaide, a hotel in Port Adelaide, Australia
 Railway Hotel, Ravenswood, a hotel in Ravenswood, Australia
 The Railway Hotel, Hua Hin, a hotel in Hua Hin, Thailand
 The Railway Hotel, Southend, a pub in Southend-on-Sea, England
 "Railway Hotel", a 1977 song by Mike Batt